Loud is the debut EP by American pop rock band R5. It was released on February 19, 2013 through Hollywood Records. It was released on United Kingdom and Ireland on February 28, 2013. As of 2014, the EP has sold 50,000 copies in the US.

Singles
"Loud" was released as the first single from the EP. The music video was released on February 22, 2013.

Track listing 
All tracks written by Evan "Kidd" Bogart, Andrew Goldstein, Emanuel Kiriakou and Lindy Robbins except where noted. All tracks produced by Kiriakou and Goldstein.

Charts

Release history

References 

R5 (band) albums
2013 EPs
Hollywood Records EPs